Sierra Leone Airways was the national airline of Sierra Leone. It was based at the Lungi International Airport, in Lungi, Sierra Leone. It operated scheduled domestic, regional and international services.

History 
Sierra Leone Airways was founded as Sierra Leone's national carrier in 1958 when the government withdrew from the regional West African Airways Corporation partnership with Nigeria, Ghana, and the Gambia. In 1982, the Sierra Leone government entered into a partnership with Alia/Royal Jordanian Airlines, and relaunched Sierra Leone Airways as Sierra Leone Airlines. Following the suspension of operations by Sierra Leone Airlines in 1987, services from Freetown were resumed on 1 May 1990 under the Sierra National Airlines. its complication

In early 2004 the airline experienced some problems with its United Kingdom Sales and Reservations structures which were restructured. Scheduled flights between London Gatwick Airport and Lungi International Airport, Freetown, resumed on 30 November 2004.

They intend to operate a Douglas DC-9 on Freetown – Liberia – Accra – Abidjan services, and a service between Freetown and Johannesburg. A Boeing 767 would be used on the Freetown-London service, with connections to other cities in Europe. They also intended to commence flights to Dubai with connections through Banjul and Conakry

In early 2005 the Sierra Leone Airports Authority claimed that SNA owed them US$800,000 in charges for landing fees, electricity, rent and ground handling services and complained that the refusal to pay the debts is affecting their operations. They won a court case against the airline but the government stopped the process.

International scheduled destinations 

As of January 2005 Sierra National Airlines operated the following services:

London (Gatwick Airport)
Amsterdam (Amsterdam Schiphol Airport)
Banjul (Banjul International Airport)
Monrovia (Roberts International Airport)
Conakry (Conakry International Airport)

Fleet 

 de Havilland Dragon Rapide

 de Havilland Heron

 Scottish Aviation Twin Pioneer
 Bristol Britannia 312
 Vickers VC10
 Boeing 707
 Boeing 720
 Boeing 727
 Boeing 767
 Britten Norman BN-2A Trislander
 Lockheed L-1011
 McDonnell Douglas MD-83

External links
Sierra National Airlines (website does not appear to have been updated since November 2004)

References 

Defunct airlines of Sierra Leone
Airlines established in 1990
Airlines disestablished in 2006
Government-owned airlines
1990 establishments in Africa
2006 disestablishments in Africa